Mozammel Hossain (1 August 1940 – 10 January 2020) was a Bangladesh Awami League politician and a member of Parliament from Bagerhat-1 and Bagerhat-4.

Early life
Hossain was born on 1 August 1940. He had a M.B.B.S. degree.

Career
Hossain was elected as a member of the parliament from Bagerhat-1 in 1991. Later, he was elected from Bagerhat-4 in 1996. He was also elected to the parliament in 2008, 2014 and 2018 from Bagerhat-4 as a Bangladesh Awami League candidate.

Hossain was appointed as the state minister of the Ministry of Social Welfare and Ministry of Women and Children Affairs in 1996. He was the chairperson of the Parliamentary Standing Committee of Ministry of Social Welfare.

Death
On 10 January 2020, Hossain died from kidney disease at age 79.

References

Awami League politicians
2020 deaths
1940 births
Deaths from kidney disease
10th Jatiya Sangsad members
11th Jatiya Sangsad members
5th Jatiya Sangsad members
7th Jatiya Sangsad members
9th Jatiya Sangsad members
State Ministers of Women and Children Affairs (Bangladesh)
State Ministers of Social Welfare
Bangladeshi physicians